Enteria arena (formerly Tipsport Arena or ČEZ Arena) is an indoor sporting arena in Pardubice, Czech Republic with maximum capacity of 10,194.

History
The first artificial ice rink in Pardubice was built there in 1947, later being rebuilt into an indoor ice hockey arena in 1960. In 2001, it was completely renovated to become one of the largest indoor arenas in the Czech Republic. It is currently home to the HC Pardubice ice hockey team, as well as the BK Pardubice basketball team. It hosted the IIHF Ice Hockey World Junior Championships in 2002 and 2008, the IIHF Inline Hockey World Championships in 2011 and 2014, and the men's and women's Ball Hockey World Championships in 2017 and Oktagon Prime 4 in 2021.

In 2015 the arena was renamed to Tipsport arena. In 2019 the arena was renamed to Enteria Arena.

See also
Home Credit Arena (formerly known as Tipsport Arena), in Liberec, Czech Republic
Tipsport Arena (Prague)

References

External links

 Enteria Arena 

Indoor ice hockey venues in the Czech Republic
Buildings and structures in Pardubice
1958 establishments in Czechoslovakia
Sports venues completed in 1958
20th-century architecture in the Czech Republic